Sydney-Bligh was an electoral district of the Legislative Assembly in the Australian state of New South Wales, in central Sydney, created in 1894, with the abolition of the multi-member district of East Sydney and named after naval officer and colonial administrator William Bligh. It was in the Darlinghurst area, bounded by Riley Street, William Street, King's Cross Road, Bayswater Road, Neild Avenue, Boundary Street and Oxford Street. It was abolished in 1904 and partly replaced by the electoral district of Darlinghurst.

Members for Sydney-Bligh

Election results

References

Former electoral districts of New South Wales
Constituencies established in 1894
1894 establishments in Australia
Constituencies disestablished in 1904
1904 disestablishments in Australia